Queen Zhejue (personal name unknown) was the only historically known queen of the Xianbei-led Chinese Southern Liang dynasty. Her husband was the state's final ruler, Tufa Rutan (Prince Jing).

Very little is known about Queen Zhejue, who was likely from the nearby Zhejue tribe, also of Xianbei extraction. She bore Tufa Rutan at least one son, the crown king Tufa Hutai (禿髮虎台). It is not known when she died, and therefore not whether she survived the state's destruction in 414 and her husband's and son's deaths (in 415 and 423, respectively) at the hands of Western Qin's king Qifu Chipan.

Southern Liang (Sixteen Kingdoms) people
Sixteen Kingdoms nobility
5th-century deaths
Year of birth unknown